John Russell (born 18 May 1985) is an Irish former professional footballer and current manager of Sligo Rovers in the League of Ireland Premier Division.

Personal life
John's sister Julie-Ann plays for  Galway W.F.C. John is also an FAI Development Officer for Sligo.

Career

Galway United
Russell started his League of Ireland football career with Galway United where he spent his first seasons as a player but in 2006 he left the club after three seasons at Terryland Park.
Russell re-signed for Galway United for the 2007 season and he spent a further three seasons at the club.

Sligo Rovers
For the 2010 season Russell signed for Sligo Rovers. He became an important part of the Sligo's side, becoming one of the most impressive performers of the 2010 campaign. Russell started the 2010 FAI Cup Final against Shamrock Rovers. The game finished 0–0 (AET) but Sligo won the final on penalties. In total in his first season at Sligo he made twenty league appearances scoring three times.
Russell signed back again for the 2011 season where he made thirty-four appearances scoring four times for The Bit O'Red.
Russell started the 2011 FAI Cup Final against Shelbourne. The game finished 1–1 (AET) but Sligo won the cup again on penalties for the second year in a row.

Russell left Sligo Rovers shortly after. In 2014, Russell re-signed with Sligo Rovers. In 2019, he returned as a player/coach.

St Patrick's Athletic
On 20 January 2012, Russell signed for Dublin side St Patrick's Athletic and was giving the number 18 jersey. Buckley spoke to stpatsfc.com about the signing the Galway native:"John is a very exciting, attacking player who will fit in with the way we will play this season. He has been excellent for Sligo over the past two seasons and we're delighted to get him on board". He hit the post and was later sent off after a questionable decision against Cliftonville in the Setanta Cup Russell started the season off well, scoring away to Dundalk at Oriel Park, scoring the second goal in the 5–1 thumping of rivals Shamrock Rovers and setting up Chris Fagan to make it 4–1 in the same game. Russell picked up the RTÉ Man of the Match award for his superb assist of Sean O'Connor's goal and an excellent energetic performance away to his old club Sligo Rovers. Russell missed a penalty in a Europa League game against NK Široki Brijeg from Bosnia and Herzegovina at the Stadion Pecara, but just 2 minutes later he set up Christy Fagan to open the scoring. Fagan returned the favour in the second leg when he set Russell up to open the scoring in a 2–1 after extra-time to earn a tie with German culb Hannover 96.

International career
Russell has been capped at u19 level for the Republic of Ireland national under-19 football team.

Coaching career
In March 2018, Russell was appointed as Westport United manager for the 2018 season of the Mayo Super League.

In December 2018, it was announced that Russell would be returning to The Showgrounds and Sligo Rovers in a player-coach capacity. He would be assistant manager to Liam Buckley as well as being a registered player.

On 22 May 2022, it was announced that Liam Buckley would depart the club, with Russell stepping in as interim manager. On 2 June 2022, he was named as manager of the club on a permanent basis.

Managerial statistics
Competitive games only – correct as of 17 March 2023.

Honours
Sligo Rovers
FAI Cup (2): 2010, 2011
League of Ireland Cup (1) : 2010
Setanta Sports Cup (1): 2014

St Patrick's Athletic
League of Ireland (1): 2013

References

External links
 

1985 births
Living people
People from Galway (city)
Association footballers from County Galway
Republic of Ireland association footballers
League of Ireland players
Galway United F.C. (1937–2011) players
Sligo Rovers F.C. players
St Patrick's Athletic F.C. players
Association football midfielders
League of Ireland XI players
Salthill Devon F.C. players
Sligo Rovers F.C. managers